Aaron Rehkop (March 10, 1891 - November 3, 1967) was an American politician from Warrensburg, Missouri, who served in the Missouri Senate.  He served in the U.S. Army during World War I.  Rehkop was first elected to the 17th Missouri senate district in 1918 by 256 votes in a Democratic-leaning district.  He was educated at several different schools, receiving a bachelor of arts, a master of arts, a bachelor of divinity, a master of theology, and a doctor of theology.

References

1891 births
1967 deaths
United States Army personnel of World War I
Republican Party Missouri state senators
20th-century American politicians
People from Warrensburg, Missouri
People from Higginsville, Missouri